Paracoccus thiocyanatus is a coccoid bacterium. It utilises thiocyanate and is a facultative chemolithotroph. Its type strain is THI 011T, and it is most related to Paracoccus aminophilus.

References

Further reading
 van Verseveld, H.W. and Stouthamer, A.H. (1999). The Genus Paracoccus. The Prokaryotes. 3rd edition, release 3.0. Springer-Verlag, New York.

External links
Type strain of Paracoccus thiocyanatus at BacDive -  the Bacterial Diversity Metadatabase

Rhodobacteraceae
Bacteria described in 1995